The Works, Jonatha Brooke's seventh solo release, is a full-length album of previously unheard lyrics by Woody Guthrie, set to original music written and performed by Brooke. 
Brooke was invited by Guthrie's daughter Nora to sift through the private archives and hunt through Guthrie's unreleased material for possible adaptations. Brooke said she was "smitten" with Guthrie's work and going through it was like "going to church." She liked his poetic love songs like "My Sweet and Bitter Bowl" and spiritual deeper tunes like "My Battle" and loved Guthrie's "full spectrum of craziness" as she described his writings.

Track listing
All songs written by Woody Guthrie (lyrics) and Jonatha Brooke (music), except where indicated.
"My Sweet and Bitter Bowl"
"You'd Oughta Be Satisfied Now"
"All You Gotta Do Is Touch Me"
"My Flowers Grow Green"
"Madonna on the Curb"
"There's More True Lovers Than One"
"Sweetest Angel"
"My Battle"
"Little Bird" (lyrics by Jonatha Brooke)
"Taste of Danger" (lyrics by Jonatha Brooke)
"New Star"
"Coney Island Intro"
"King of My Love"

Album credits
Jonatha Brooke – vocals, guitar
Steve Gadd – drums
Greg Leisz –  steel guitar
Christian McBride – bass guitar
Joe Sample – keyboard

Additional musicians
Eric Bazilian – vocals on "There's More True Lovers Than One"
Keb Mo – vocals on "All you Gotta Do Is Touch Me"
Glen Phillips – vocals on "Sweetest Angel"
Derek Trucks – slide guitar on "New Star"

See also
Woody Guthrie Foundation
Billy Bragg & Wilco - Mermaid Avenue, (1998/2012)
The Klezmatics - Wonderwheel, (2006)
Jay Farrar - New Multitudes, (2012)

References

Woody Guthrie tribute albums
2008 albums
Jonatha Brooke albums
Albums produced by Bob Clearmountain